The Bare Cemetery is a cemetery complex in Sarajevo, Bosnia and Herzegovina opened in 1965, with the first funeral and interment occurring on 3 January 1966.

The central part of the cemetery is a spacious plateau with a staircase and a porch that connects the Catholic, Orthodox, Muslim, Jewish and atheist chapels, designed by Smiljan Klaić, and the frescoes in the porch were painted by Rizah Štetić.

Burials
 Alija Behmen (1940–2018), politician and former Mayor of Sarajevo
 Božidar Matić (1937–2016), politician and former Chairman of the Council of Ministers
 Goran Čengić (1946–1992), handball player
 Mirza Delibašić (1954–2001), basketball player
 Srđan Dizdarević (1952–2016), journalist, diplomat, and activist
 Ines Fančović (1925–2011), actress
 Ivica Osim (1941–2022), footballer and football coach
 Milan Ribar (1930–1996), footballer and football coach
 Muhamed Filipović (1929–2020), writer, essayist, theorist and philosopher
 Anur Hadžiomerspahić (1971–2017), artist and graphic designer
 Slobodan Kovačević (1946–2004), rock guitarist
 Žan Marolt (1964–2009), actor
 Kemal Monteno (1948–2015), singer-songwriter
 Davorin Popović (1946–2001), singer-songwriter
 Jovan Divjak (1937–2021), Bosnian army general
 Vaso Radić (1923–2011), politician and former Mayor of Sarajevo
 Dražen Ričl (1962–1986), rock musician
 Hasan Brkić (1913–1965), politician and partisan
 Beba Selimović (1936–2020), folk and sevdalinka singer
 Emina Zečaj (1929–2020), sevdalinka singer

References

External links
 
 

1965 establishments in Bosnia and Herzegovina
Buildings and structures in Sarajevo
Cemeteries in Sarajevo